Wandal may refer to the following places:

Australia 
 Wandal, Queensland, a suburb in the Rockhampton Region, Queensland, Australia

India

Karnataka 
 Wandal, Nidagundi, a village in Basavana Bagevadi Taluk, Bijapur district
 Wandal, Sindagi, a village in Sindgi Taluk, Bijapur district
 Wandali, Karnataka, a village in Lingsugur Taluk, Raichur district

Maharashtra 
 Wandali, Maharashtra, a village in Teosa Taluka of Amravati district